Herbert Richard Byrne,  (28 October 1887 – 3 August 1959) was an Australian rules footballer who played with Fitzroy in the Victorian Football League (VFL).

Family
The son of Richard Byrne (1860–1908) and  Olivia Gertrude Byrne, née Keenan (1864–1931), Herbert Richard Byrne was born at Richmond in Victoria on 28 October 1887.

Football
Having come to attention while playing for Xavier College, Byrne made two senior appearances for Fitzroy in the 1907 VFL season.

Military service
Byrne had a long and distinguished career in the Australian Army.

After enlisting to serve in World War I, Byrne served on the Gallipoli peninsula and in Egypt as an officer. He was awarded the Distinguished Service Order in October 1917 for saving his men from a shell burst and then rescuing eight of those injured near Ypres in Belgium. Six days later, despite being wounded, he stayed with his men for two days before being ordered to leave to receive medical attention. He was Mentioned in Despatches twice.

After the war Byrne continued to serve as a part-time commissioned officer and was awarded the Colonial Auxiliary Forces Officers' Decoration for his long and meritorious service.

Byrne enlisted in the 2nd AIF while in Sydney in 1940, and served in the Australian Army for a further four years from January 1940 with the rank of Lieutenant-Colonel.

Notes

External links 
		

1887 births
1959 deaths
Australian rules footballers from Melbourne
Fitzroy Football Club players
People educated at Xavier College
Australian military personnel of World War I
Australian Army personnel of World War II
Australian Companions of the Distinguished Service Order
People from Richmond, Victoria
Military personnel from Melbourne